Nuno Miguel Bacelar de Vasconcelos Marques (born 9 April 1970) is a Portuguese former tennis player. He was the first Portuguese to reach the top 100 ATP rankings and held the record of highest ranked Portuguese player in history until Frederico Gil surpassed him in 2009. Also, he was the highest ranked Portuguese doubles player in history reaching a career high of no. 58 until 2019, when he was surpassed by João Sousa.

Career finals

Doubles: 3 (1 title, 2 runners-up)

Singles performance timeline

Awards
2013 – ITF Commitment Award

References

External links
 
 
 

1970 births
Living people
Olympic tennis players of Portugal
Portuguese male tennis players
Portuguese tennis coaches
Sportspeople from Porto
Tennis players at the 2000 Summer Olympics
20th-century Portuguese people